Football Club Rubikon Kyiv is a Ukrainian football club from the city of Kyiv. In 2018–2020 it was also representing the Kyiv's satellite city of Vyshneve carrying name of Rubikon-Vyshneve Kyiv. The team is currently playing Ukrainian Second League after competing in the Ukrainian Amateur championship.

History

The team was founded in 2017. "Rubikon" debuted in the Ukrainian Second League in the 2020–21 season.

Former names
 2017–2017 Rubikon Kyiv
 2017–2020 Rubikon-Vyshneve Kyiv
 2020– Rubikon Kyiv

League and cup history

{|class="wikitable"
|-bgcolor="#efefef"
! Season
! Div.
! Pos.
! Pl.
! W
! D
! L
! GS
! GA
! P
!Domestic Cup
!colspan=2|Europe
!Notes
|-bgcolor=SteelBlue
|align=center|2017–18
|align=center|4th
|align=center|8
|align=center|14
|align=center|1
|align=center|1
|align=center|12
|align=center|9
|align=center|32
|align=center|4
|align=center|
|align=center|
|align=center|
|align=center|
|-bgcolor=SteelBlue
|align=center|2018–19
|align=center|4th
|align=center|10
|align=center|22
|align=center|7
|align=center|5
|align=center|10
|align=center|27
|align=center|29
|align=center|26
|align=center|
|align=center|
|align=center|
|align=center|
|-bgcolor=SteelBlue
|align=center|2019–20
|align=center|4th
|align=center|6
|align=center|22
|align=center|8
|align=center|7
|align=center|7
|align=center|25
|align=center|36
|align=center|31
|align=center|
|align=center|
|align=center|
|align=center bgcolor=lightgreen|Promoted
|-bgcolor=PowderBlue
|align=center|2020–21
|align=center|3rd
|align=center|11
|align=center|24
|align=center|4	 	
|align=center|5		
|align=center|15
|align=center|17 	 	
|align=center|44
|align=center|17
|align=center|
|align=center|
|align=center|
|align=center|
|}

Current squad

Out on loan

Managers
 2017–2020 Viktor Kuriata
 2020–2021 Serhiy Litovchenko
 2021–  Viktor Kuriata

References

External links
 Official Website
 Profile at AAFU

 
Ukrainian Second League clubs
Football clubs in Kyiv Oblast
Football clubs in Kyiv
2017 establishments in Ukraine
Association football clubs established in 2017
Sport in Vyshneve